K A Narayan, also known as Narayan, was an Indian screenwriter who is known for many acclaimed films such as Johny Mera Naam (1970), Victoria No. 203 (1972), Jewel Thief (1967), Geet Gaya Patharon Ne (1964), Ek Musafir Ek Hasina'' (1962) and many more.

Filmography

References

Indian male screenwriters